Sep. 17 - Eastern Orthodox liturgical calendar - Sep. 19

All fixed commemorations below celebrated on October 1 by Eastern Orthodox Churches on the Old Calendar.

For September 18th, Orthodox Churches on the Old Calendar commemorate the Saints listed on September 5.

Saints
 Martyr Ariadne of Phrygia (c. 117-139)
 Martyrs Sophia and Irene, of Egypt, by the sword (3rd century)  (see also: August 28)
 Martyr Castor of Alexandria.
 Venerable Eumenius, Bishop of Gortyna on Crete, Wonderworker (7th century)  (see also: August 25)

Pre-Schism Western saints
 Martyr Ferreolus, an army officer, he was martyred in Vienne in France under Diocletian (3rd century)
 Saint Eustorgius I, Bishop of Milan (c. 331)
 Saint Ferreolus, fifth Bishop of Limoges in France (c. 591)
 Saint Richardis, Holy Roman Empress as the wife of Charles the Fat, and was the first abbess of Andlau Abbey (c. 895)

Post-Schism Orthodox saints
 Saint Arcadius, Bishop of Novgorod (1162)
 Venerable Romilus the Sinaite, of Ravanica (1375)
 Martyrs Bidzina, Elizbar, and Shalva, Princes of Ksani, Georgia (1660)
 Venerable Hilarion, Elder, of Optina Monastery (1873)

New martyrs and confessors
 New Hieromartyrs Alexis Kuznetsov and Peter Dyakonov, Priests (1918)
 New Hieromartyr Amphilochius (Skvortsov), Bishop of Krasnoyarsk (1937)
 New Hieromartyrs John Vasiliev, Boris Bogolepov, Michael Skobelev, Vladimir Chekalov, Benjamin Blagonadezdin, Constantine Tverdyslov, Priests (1937)
 Martyr Sergius Vedernikov (1937)

Icons
 Icon of the Mother of God of Molchensk (1405)
 Icon of the Mother of God "the Healer" (18th century))
 Translation of the Icon of the Mother of God in Triumph to Russia (returned to Staraya Russa in 1888)

Other commemorations
 Glorification (1698) of Venerable Euphrosyne, nun, of Suzdal (1250)
 Repose of Blessed Irene of Zelenogorsk Monastery (Green Hill Monastery) (18th century)

Icon gallery

Notes

References

Sources
 September 18/October 1. Orthodox Calendar (PRAVOSLAVIE.RU).
 October 1 / September 18. HOLY TRINITY RUSSIAN ORTHODOX CHURCH (A parish of the Patriarchate of Moscow).
 September 18. OCA - The Lives of the Saints.
 The Autonomous Orthodox Metropolia of Western Europe and the Americas (ROCOR). St. Hilarion Calendar of Saints for the year of our Lord 2004. St. Hilarion Press (Austin, TX). p. 70.
 The Eighteenth Day of the Month of September. Orthodoxy in China.
 September 18. Latin Saints of the Orthodox Patriarchate of Rome.
 The Roman Martyrology. Transl. by the Archbishop of Baltimore. Last Edition, According to the Copy Printed at Rome in 1914. Revised Edition, with the Imprimatur of His Eminence Cardinal Gibbons. Baltimore: John Murphy Company, 1916. p. 288.
 Rev. Richard Stanton. A Menology of England and Wales, or, Brief Memorials of the Ancient British and English Saints Arranged According to the Calendar, Together with the Martyrs of the 16th and 17th Centuries. London: Burns & Oates, 1892. pp. 451–452.

 Greek Sources
 Great Synaxaristes:  18 ΣΕΠΤΕΜΒΡΙΟΥ. ΜΕΓΑΣ ΣΥΝΑΞΑΡΙΣΤΗΣ.
  Συναξαριστής. 18 Σεπτεμβρίου. ECCLESIA.GR. (H ΕΚΚΛΗΣΙΑ ΤΗΣ ΕΛΛΑΔΟΣ).
  18/09/. Ορθόδοξος Συναξαριστής.

 Russian Sources
  1 октября (18 сентября). Православная Энциклопедия под редакцией Патриарха Московского и всея Руси Кирилла (электронная версия). (Orthodox Encyclopedia - Pravenc.ru).
  18 сентября по старому стилю  /  1 октября по новому стилю. Русская Православная Церковь - Православный церковный календарь на  год.

September in the Eastern Orthodox calendar